Pogled is a settlement north of Moravče in central Slovenia. The area is part of the traditional region of Upper Carniola. It is now included with the rest of the Municipality of Moravče in the Central Slovenia Statistical Region.

Name
Pogled was attested in historical sources as Pwͦgled in 1340 and Puͦglod in 1342.

References

External links

Pogled on Geopedia

Populated places in the Municipality of Moravče